Ferganocephale is a dubious genus of neornithischian dinosaur. It was from the Middle Jurassic Balabansai Svita of Kyrgyzstan. The type and only species is F. adenticulatum.

Classification
Ferganocephale was originally classified in the group Pachycephalosauridae. It would then be one of the oldest known pachycephalosaurids. Robert M. Sullivan however, in 2006 disputed the pachycephalosaur classification, finding "few of the features [...] are characteristic of pachycephalosaur teeth," citing the lack of serrations on the teeth, and concludes the specimens are "too incomplete for identification". He considers the taxon a nomen dubium, and a non-pachycephalosaurid ornithischian.

Discovery and naming
The type species, Ferganocephale adenticulatum, was first described by Averianov, Martin, and Bakirov in 2005, and is based solely on teeth from the Balabansai Svita in Fergana Valley, Kyrgyzstan, dating to the Callovian. The holotype is ZIN PH 34/42, an adult unworn tooth. The type species is Ferganocephale adenticulatum. The genus name combines the name of location it was found with the Greek kephale, "head", a reference to the presumed pachycephalosaurian affinities. The specific name means "without tooth serrations".

See also
 Timeline of pachycephalosaur research

References 

Ornithischian genera
Middle Jurassic dinosaurs of Asia
Fossils of Kyrgyzstan
Fossil taxa described in 2005
Nomina dubia